Salmon Lake (native name, Nahwazuk, meaning "salmon") is a natural lake on the Seward Peninsula in the U.S. state of Alaska. Its principal supply comes from Grand Central River, which enters it at its western end. A number of small streams also enter the lake from both the north and the south; Fox Creek and Jasper Creek are the most notable of these. Efforts to dam the lake in order to provide power and water supply to mining endeavors occurred from 1906-1907, However these plans were later dropped due to disputes over land ownership and water rights.

References

Lakes of Alaska
Bodies of water of Nome Census Area, Alaska
Bodies of water of the Seward Peninsula